Strobiligera is a genus of minute sea snails with left-handed shell-coiling, marine gastropod mollusks or micromollusks in the family Triphoridae.

Description
(Original description) The Protoconch larger than the succeeding whorl, 
swollen, smooth. The sutural sulcus is feeble. The siphonal canal is short and open. 

There are numerous species in the deep water of the Antilles.

Species
 Strobiligera bigemma (R. B. Watson, 1880)
 Strobiligera brychia (Bouchet & Guillemot, 1978)
 Strobiligera campista M. Fernandes & Pimenta, 2019
 Strobiligera compsa (Dall, 1927)
 Strobiligera delicata M. Fernandes & Pimenta, 2014
 Strobiligera dinea (Dall, 1927)
 Strobiligera enopla (Dall, 1927)
 Strobiligera filata (Dall, 1889)
 Strobiligera flammulata Bouchet & Warén, 1993
 Strobiligera gaesona (Dall, 1927)
 Strobiligera georgiana (Dall, 1927)
 Strobiligera ibex (Dall, 1881)
 Strobiligera inaudita (Rolán & H. G. Lee, 2008)
 Strobiligera indigena'' (Dall, 1927)
 Strobiligera lubrica Bouchet & Warén, 1993
 Strobiligera meteora (Dall, 1927)
 Strobiligera pompona (Dall, 1927)
 Strobiligera santista M. Fernandes & Pimenta, 2019
 Strobiligera sentoma (Dall, 1927)
 Strobiligera torticula (Dall, 1881)
 Strobiligera unicornium (Simone, 2006)
Synonyms
 Strobiligera inflata (R. B. Watson, 1880): synonym of Strobiligera filata'' (Dall, 1889)

References

External links
 Dall, William Healey. 1927. "Small shells from dredgings off the southeast coast of the United States by the United States Fisheries steamer Albatross in 1885 and 1886." Proceedings of the United States National Museum. 70 (2667):1–134
 Bouchet P. (1985). Les Triphoridae de Méditerranée et du proche Atlantique (Mollusca, Gastropoda). Lavori, Società Italiana di Malacologia. 21: 5-58.
 Bouchet P. & Warén A. (1993). Revision of the Northeast Atlantic bathyal and abyssal Mesogastropoda. Bollettino Malacologico supplemento 3: 579-840
 Fernandes M.R. & Pimenta A.D. (2014). Two species of the genus Strobiligera (Caenogastropoda: Triphoridae) with a multispiral protoconch in southeastern Brazil. American Malacological Bulletin. 32(2):165-172

Triphoridae